Elizabeth "Nana" Shineflug (1935 - 15 January 2015) was an American dancer and choreographer. She started and led the Chicago Moving Company, a modern-dance troupe. Her style was not traditional: "Shineflug nurtured our God-given right to weirdness...," according to critic. Laura Molzahn.

Shineflung's maiden name was Elizabeth Strohmeier. She grew up in Evanston, Illinois.

Career
Shineflug graduated from Northwestern University with a degree in Mathematics. Later, she was awarded an M.A. (1986) and Graduate Certificate in Laban Movement Analysis from Columbia College, Chicago.
In 1972, she started the Chicago Moving Company. She taught at Columbia College Chicago in the Interdisciplinary Arts Graduate Program and the Theater Department  She also taught modern dance, Qi Gong, and Psychocalesthenics through the Chicago Moving Company.  She also performed and taught in other countries.

Nana Shineflug died of cancer in her Glenview, Illinois home on 15 January 2015. She was seventy-nine years old.

Awards
 Four Choreographic Fellowships from National Endowment for the Arts
 The Katherine Dunham Award for Excellence and Dedication to the Arts
 Chicago Dance Coalition/Ruth Page Lifetime Service to the Field Award
 Three Illinois Arts Council Choreographic Fellowships
 Ruth Page Award, Honorable Mention for the Dance Legacy Project
 Boulevard Arts Center's Presidents Award
 Two Illinois Alliance for Arts Education Service Recognition Awards
 Prestigious National Endowment for Arts Arts-Plus Partnership
 Columbia College Chicago Lifetime Achievement Award

Further sources

References

1935 births
2015 deaths
American choreographers
American female dancers
American dancers
Deaths from cancer in Illinois
People from Evanston, Illinois
Modern dancers
21st-century American women